Kevin Newman may refer to:

Kevin Newman (baseball) (born 1994), American baseball player
Kevin Newman (journalist) (born 1959), Canadian journalist and news anchor
Kevin Newman (politician) (1933–1999), Australian soldier and politician